Gary O'Donnell (born 12 May 1965) is a former Australian rules footballer who played 243 games for the Essendon Football Club between 1987 and 1998. He previously served as the assistant coach in the role Offensive Strategy Coach at the Brisbane Lions.

Family
O'Donnell is the son of Bev and Graeme O'Donnell. He is a member of a prominent Australian rules football family. O'Donnell's paternal grandmother, Eileen O'Donnell (née Rankin) was the daughter of Teddy Rankin and the sister of Bert, Cliff and Doug Rankin. All four were prominent players with Geelong. His father were also a notable player. His sister, Shelley O'Donnell, is a former Australia netball international.

Playing career
O’Donnell was a junior teammate of Paul Salmon at North Ringwood where they won 4 premierships in succession from 1977 up to the under 16s in 1980. Prior to the introduction of the player draft, Ringwood was part of Essendon’s recruitment zone.

Essendon Football Club
O’Donnell’s start at VFL football didn't come easy: he played nearly 50 reserve grade matches before being selected to make his debut in the last game of the 1987 season. From there he held down a steady place in the side, first as a defender, then later developing into a tagging midfielder who was capable of getting the football as well as keeping an opposition player quiet. At his peak, O'Donnell was regarded as one of the most consistent players in the competition, with commentators often stating that he "never plays a bad game".

O'Donnell played 243 games from 1987 to 1998, leading the Bombers as captain for two seasons in a decorated career in the red and black. Known as 'Mr Reliable', he was a vital part of Essendon's 1993 premiership side, a year which also saw him win the Crichton Medal as the Bombers' best and fairest.

Underlining this consistency is his record in the club best-and-fairest: O'Donnell finished in the top three six years in a row, winning it in 1993, a premiership year for the Bombers. He also won the Michael Tuck Medal in 1994 as the best player in the pre-season grand final. Additionally, O'Donnell represented Victoria nine times in state of origin football.

O'Donnell was always regarded as one of the most astute thinkers in the game, and was rewarded with the captaincy for the 1996 and 1997 seasons.

Coaching career

Brisbane Lions
He reputation was further enhanced when after his retirement from his playing career, he took up an assistant coaching role with the Brisbane Lions in 1999 under senior coach Leigh Matthews. His tactical insight was a key part of the Lions' rise up the ladder, culminating in three premierships from 2001 to 2003.

Essendon Football Club
After Brisbane's grand final loss in 2004, Gary O'Donnell announced that he would be returning to Essendon in 2005 as an assistant coach under senior coach Kevin Sheedy.  On 22 July 2006, in Round 16, 2006,  O'Donnell coached Essendon as caretaker interim senior coach for one game due to the absence of regular senior coach Kevin Sheedy, who injured his shoulder in a collision with defender Dean Solomon at training. Essendon drew with long-time rivals Carlton to end its then-record 14-match losing streak dating back to round two.

Some people had speculated that O'Donnell's return to Essendon indicated that he was the preferred replacement for Sheedy upon the latter's retirement, but O'Donnell denied this, and on 27 September 2007 it was announced that Matthew Knights would be Sheedy's successor. O'Donnell remained as an assistant coach at Essendon Football Club until the end of the 2010 season.

Return to Brisbane Lions
In October 2010, O'Donnell returned to the Brisbane Lions as an assistant coach under senior coach Michael Voss. O'Donnell left the Brisbane Lions at the end of the 2016 season.

Statistics

Playing statistics

|-
|- style="background-color: #EAEAEA"
! scope="row" style="text-align:center" | 1987
|style="text-align:center;"|
| 44 || 1 || 0 || 0 || 4 || 3 || 7 || 1 || 3 || 0.0 || 0.0 || 4.0 || 3.0 || 7.0 || 1.0 || 3.0 || 0
|-
! scope="row" style="text-align:center" | 1988
|style="text-align:center;"|
| 44 || 20 || 5 || 1 || 196 || 109 || 305 || 41 || 35 || 0.3 || 0.1 || 9.8 || 5.5 || 15.3 || 2.1 || 1.8 || 0
|- style="background-color: #EAEAEA"
! scope="row" style="text-align:center" | 1989
|style="text-align:center;"|
| 44 || 25 || 3 || 7 || 277 || 176 || 453 || 73 || 32 || 0.1 || 0.3 || 11.1 || 7.0 || 18.1 || 2.9 || 1.3 || 3
|-
! scope="row" style="text-align:center" | 1990
|style="text-align:center;"|
| 10 || 25 || 11 || 11 || 346 || 158 || 504 || 69 || 32 || 0.4 || 0.4 || 13.8 || 6.3 || 20.2 || 2.8 || 1.3 || 10
|- style="background-color: #EAEAEA"
! scope="row" style="text-align:center" | 1991
|style="text-align:center;"|
| 10 || 22 || 5 || 5 || 253 || 174 || 427 || 50 || 23 || 0.2 || 0.2 || 11.5 || 7.9 || 19.4 || 2.3 || 1.0 || 2
|-
! scope="row" style="text-align:center" | 1992
|style="text-align:center;"|
| 10 || 20 || 10 || 13 || 296 || 157 || 453 || 75 || 31 || 0.5 || 0.7 || 14.8 || 7.9 || 22.7 || 3.8 || 1.6 || 2
|- style="background-color: #EAEAEA"
|style="text-align:center;background:#afe6ba;"|1993†
|style="text-align:center;"|
| 10 || 24 || 14 || 9 || 389 || 221 || 610 || 85 || 49 || 0.6 || 0.4 || 16.2 || 9.2 || 25.4 || 3.5 || 2.0 || 6
|-
! scope="row" style="text-align:center" | 1994
|style="text-align:center;"|
| 10 || 20 || 5 || 5 || 250 || 202 || 452 || 63 || 26 || 0.3 || 0.3 || 12.5 || 10.1 || 22.6 || 3.2 || 1.3 || 5
|- style="background-color: #EAEAEA"
! scope="row" style="text-align:center" | 1995
|style="text-align:center;"|
| 10 || 24 || 16 || 10 || 339 || 182 || 521 || 69 || 21 || 0.7 || 0.4 || 14.1 || 7.6 || 21.7 || 2.9 || 0.9 || 1
|-
! scope="row" style="text-align:center" | 1996
|style="text-align:center;"|
| 10 || 25 || 8 || 6 || 281 || 195 || 476 || 81 || 46 || 0.3 || 0.2 || 11.2 || 7.8 || 19.0 || 3.2 || 1.8 || 4
|- style="background-color: #EAEAEA"
! scope="row" style="text-align:center" | 1997
|style="text-align:center;"|
| 10 || 20 || 8 || 3 || 211 || 116 || 327 || 44 || 27 || 0.4 || 0.2 || 10.6 || 5.8 || 16.4 || 2.2 || 1.4 || 1
|-
! scope="row" style="text-align:center" | 1998
|style="text-align:center;"|
| 10 || 17 || 3 || 2 || 205 || 92 || 297 || 45 || 34 || 0.2 || 0.1 || 12.1 || 5.4 || 17.5 || 2.6 || 2.0 || 1
|- class="sortbottom"
! colspan=3| Career
! 243
! 88
! 72
! 3047
! 1785
! 4832
! 696
! 359
! 0.4
! 0.3
! 12.5
! 7.3
! 19.9
! 2.9
! 1.5
! 35
|}

Coaching statistics

|- style="background-color: #EAEAEA"
! scope="row" style="text-align:center; font-weight:normal" | 2006
|style="text-align:center;"|
| 1 || 0 || 0 || 1 || 50.0% ||  || 
|- style="background-color: #EAEAEA"
|- class="sortbottom"
! colspan=2| Career totals
! 1
! 0
! 0
! 1
! 50.0%
! colspan=2|
|}

References

External links
 

1965 births
Living people
Australian rules footballers from Melbourne
Australian people of Irish descent
Essendon Football Club players
Essendon Football Club Premiership players
Essendon Football Club coaches
Victorian State of Origin players
Crichton Medal winners
Australia international rules football team players
Rankin family of Geelong
One-time VFL/AFL Premiership players
People from Ringwood, Victoria